Labanga Latika (Odia: ଲବଙ୍ଗ ଲତା/ଲବଙ୍ଗି) is traditional sweet from the regions of Bengal, Odisha, Bihar and Uttar Pradesh.

Ingredients 
A typical labanga latika is made of maida, khoya, nutmeg powder, grated coconut, ghee, nuts, raisins, cardamom, cloves, and sugar ingredients.

Preparation 
Labanga latika consists of filling, dough, and sugar syrup. The dough is rolled out first and then the filling is placed in the center. The dough is then folded to enclose the filling completely and cloves are pressed over it to ensure that the fold doesn't open up while preparing. Then it's cooked in hot ghee until golden brown and crispy. Lastly, it is placed in sugar syrup to cool down and absorb the syrup

Dough 
The dough is prepared in maida with water and ghee until the desired consistency is reached.

Sugar syrup 
Sugar syrup is a mixture of sugar and water, prepared by adding sugar to boiling water and stirring as to prevent burning. This continues until the mixture reaches a thick consistency.

Filling 
The filling is a mixture of khoya, sugar, and grated coconut. These are to be cooked and adorned with dried fruits and nutmeg.

See also

 List of desserts

Notes

References

Indian cuisine
Odia cuisine
Bengali cuisine
Indian desserts